Acacia tenuinervis is a shrub or tree belonging to the genus Acacia and the subgenus Juliflorae that is native to north eastern Australia.

Description
It has black to grey-brown coloured bark that is quite furrowed. The orange-red or red-brown branchlets are covered with a fine white powder are usually angular towards the apices and become glabrous and scurfy with age. Like most species of Acacia it has phyllodes rather than true leaves. It blooms between August and September producing golden flowers. The black seeds are arranged longitudinally within the pod.

Taxonomy
The species was first formally described in 1978 by the botanist Leslie Pedley as a part of the work A revision of Acacia Mill. in Queensland as published in the journal Austrobaileya. Pedley later reclassified it as Racosperma tenuinerve in 1987 and it was then transferred back to genus Acacia in 2001.

Distribution
It is endemic a few small sized areas of South East Queensland including Glenmorgan, Boondooma and Impey pastoral properties where it is found growing in gravelly ironstone soils as a part of Acacia harpophylla scrub or open Eucalyptus'' woodland communities.

See also
List of Acacia species

References

tenuinervis
Flora of Queensland
Taxa named by Leslie Pedley
Plants described in 1978